Mahindar Pall Singh (Punjabi), also known as Paa Ji, is a Pakistani politician who had been member of the Provincial Assembly of Punjab from August 2018 till January 2023.

Political career
He was elected to Provincial Assembly of Punjab on a reserved seat for minorities in 2018 Pakistani general election representing Pakistan Tehreek-e-Insaf

Singh belongs to the Sikh community of Pakistan. He is the second Sikh to become a member of Punjab's provincial assembly after Ramesh Singh Arora, and hails from Nankana Sahib but lives in Multan.
He is famous business man of Sikh community of Multan. He is elected as minority MPA in 2018 election on PTI ticket and became first Sikh MPA in Multan.

References

Living people
Pakistan Tehreek-e-Insaf MPAs (Punjab)
People from Nankana Sahib District
Politicians from Multan
Punjab MPAs 2018–2023
Punjabi people
Year of birth missing (living people)
Pakistani Sikhs